Pico de Orizaba, also known as Citlaltépetl (from Nahuatl  = star, and  = mountain), is an active stratovolcano, the highest mountain in Mexico and the third highest in North America, after Denali of Alaska in the United States and Mount Logan of Canada. Pico de Orizaba is also the highest volcanic summit in North America. The volcano is currently dormant but not extinct, with the last eruption taking place during the 19th century. It is the second most prominent volcanic peak in the world after Africa's Mount Kilimanjaro.

Toponymy
Pico de Orizaba overlooks the valley and city of Orizaba, from which it gets its Spanish name. During the colonial era, the volcano was also known as Cerro de San Andrés due to the nearby settlement of San Andrés Chalchicomula at its base.

Its Náhuatl name, Citlaltépetl, comes from citlalli (star) and tepētl (mountain) and thus means "Star Mountain". This name is thought to be based on the fact that the snow-covered peak can be seen year round for hundreds of kilometers throughout the region. This name is not, however, used by Náhuatl speakers of the Orizaba area, who instead call it Istaktepetl (Iztactépetl in the traditional orthography for Classical Nahuatl), meaning 'White Mountain'.

A third name, Poyauhtecatl, which means "the one that colours or illuminates", has also been recorded. This name was given by the Tlaxcaltecs in memory of their lost country.

Topography
Regionally dominant, Pico de Orizaba is the highest peak in Mexico and the highest volcano in North America; it is also the third highest peak in North America after Denali and Mount Logan. Orizaba is ranked 7th in the world in topographic prominence. It is the second most prominent volcanic peak in the world after Africa's Mount Kilimanjaro, and the volcano is also ranked 16th in the world for topographic isolation. About  to the west of the port of Veracruz, its peak is visible to ships approaching the port in the Gulf of Mexico, and at dawn rays of sunlight strike the Pico while Veracruz still lies in shadow. The topography of Pico de Orizaba is asymmetrical from the center of the crater; the eastern face is the steepest side of the volcano and the northwestern face the most gradual side. The gradual slopes of the northwestern face of the volcano allows for the presence of large glaciers and is the most traveled route to take for hikers traveling to the summit.

Glaciers

Pico de Orizaba is one of only three volcanoes in México that continue to support glaciers and is home to the largest glacier in Mexico, Gran Glaciar Norte. Orizaba has nine known glaciers: Gran Glaciar Norte, Lengua del Chichimeco, Jamapa, Toro, Glaciar de la Barba, Noroccidental, Occidental, Suroccidental, and Oriental. The equilibrium line altitude (ELA) is not known for Orizaba. Snow on the south and southeast sides of the volcano melts quickly because of solar radiation, but lower temperatures on the northwest and north sides allow for glaciers. The insolation angle and wind redeposition on the northwest and north sides allow for constant accumulation of snow providing a source for the outlet glaciers. On the north side of Orizaba, the Gran Glaciar Norte fills the elongated highland basin and is the source for seven outlet glaciers. It has a slightly irregular and stepped profile that is caused in part by the configuration of the bedrock.

Both tongues terminate in broad convex-upward ice fans thinning along their edges. The retreat of these tongues prior to 1994 produced much erosion downstream and buried their edges by ablation rock debris.

The west side of Gran Glaciar Norte generates five outlet glaciers. They then descend  farther down into the heads of stream valleys as huge ice blocks but are not regenerated there.

No earlier historical record of glacier tongue activity (advance or recession) is known for Citlaltépetl's glaciers. Although the Gran Glaciar Norte ice cap is covered with snow, it is possible to see the seven outlet glaciers on the irregular west margin of the ice cap, especially Glaciar de Jamapa and Glaciar Occidental.

Climate

The climate of Pico de Orizaba, like the Sierra Madre Oriental, varies greatly due to the change of elevation and prevailing winds. Due to the latitude and the extreme rugged terrain the volcano experiences many microclimates. Vegetation varies from tropical at the lower elevations on the eastern face to alpine forests in the higher elevations.

Large amounts of precipitation fall on the eastern face of the volcano due to adiabatic cooling and condensation from the trade winds that bring moisture off the Gulf of Mexico. The eastern face is frequently covered by fog and low cloud cover.

Autumn and winter come with frequent freezes and light snow, but the snow on the south and southeast sides melt quickly due to solar radiation. The northern face is dominated by subtropical highland (Cwb). The southern face mostly experiences a humid subtropical climate, (Cwa) with the highest annual temperatures in the month of April.

Vegetation here is grass and shrubs with few alpine species.

Snow on the south and southeast melts due to solar radiation, but continually remains on the north and northwestern faces.

Geology

Pico de Orizaba evolved in three stages, the most recent initiated about 16,000 years ago during the late Pleistocene and Holocene. Citlaltépetl consists of three superimposed stratovolcanoes and dome intrusions: Torrecillas (650–250 ka), Espolón de Oro (210– 16 ka), and Citlaltépetl (16 ka to present). The volcano was formed by thick andesitic and dacitic lavas that followed repetitive explosive eruptions and lava effusions that created the iconic cone structure. The volcano is currently dormant but not extinct. The latest eruption of the volcano occurred in 1846 with a magnitude of VEI 2. Previous eruptions occurred in: 1687, 1613, 1589–1569, 1566, 1555–1545,1539–1533, 1351, 1260, 1187, 1175, 1157, 220 AD, 140 AD, 90 AD, 40 AD, ~780 BC, ~1500 BC, ~2110 BC, ~2300 BC, ~2500 BC, ~2780 BC, ~4690 BC, ~6220 BC, ~6710 BC, ~7030 BC, and ~7530 BC. The most violent eruption in the volcano's history is thought to have occurred around 6710 BC reaching a magnitude of VEI 5 characterized by lava dome extrusion and pyroclastic flow.

Pico de Orizaba is constantly covered by an ice cap consisting of several glaciers. An outlet glacier, known as Jamapa Glacier is located on the north-eastern side of the peak; it has been a powerful force in shaping the volcano. The Jamapa Glacier is responsible for a significant portion of the geomorphologic evolution of the region surrounding the volcano.

Geography

Orizaba anchors the south-eastern end of the Trans-Mexican Volcanic Belt, a volcanic chain that runs from west to east across Central Mexico. This subsidiary peak is significantly lower than its massive neighbour, but the road to the observatory on its summit is the highest road in North America.

Pico de Orizaba, as part of the Sierra Madre Oriental, forms a barrier between the coastal plains of the Gulf of Mexico and the Mexican Plateau. The volcano blocks the moisture from the Gulf of Mexico from saturating central Mexico and influences the climates of both areas. Both the state of Veracruz and Puebla depend on Pico de Orizaba for supplying fresh water. The largest river originating on the volcano is the Jamapa River.

History

Pico de Orizaba was important in pre-Hispanic cultures, such as those of the Nahuatl-speaking Aztecs and the Totonacs. The volcano is part of many native mythologies.

During the Spanish Conquest of Mexico, Hernán Cortés passed through the foothills of Pico de Orizaba; the volcano and the surrounding mountains made his journey to Tenochtitlan more difficult and delayed him for many days. During the 1600s, the Spanish Crown financed several roads to be built that would circumvent Citlaltépetl. One of the roads was routed south of the volcano through the cities of Orizaba and Fortín de las Flores, which became the main trade route between Mexico City and Veracruz on the Gulf Coast. A short road was later built by Jesuits to establish settlements at the base of Pico de Orizaba. The Spanish used the volcano as a landmark to guide themselves to the port of Veracruz. Many battles were fought near this volcano throughout Mexico's struggle for independence.

In 1839, Henri Galeotti was the first European to explore the volcano, but did not hike to the summit. During the American occupation of Mexico in 1848, two American soldiers, F. Maynard and William F. Raynolds, were the first known hikers to reach the summit of Pico de Orizaba. In 1851, the French explorer Alejandro Doignon also reached the summit and found the flagpole left behind by the Americans in 1848. During the mid-19th century Citlaltépetl was explored by many scientists, including the German botanist Hugo Fink, who was the first to record the numerous species of flora found on the volcano. In 1873, Martin Tritschler raised the Mexican flag at the summit.

Pico de Orizaba National Park
On December 16, 1936, President Lázaro Cárdenas, in an effort to protect the natural beauty of Pico de Orizaba, created a national park with an area of  that included the volcano with the surrounding area and the settlements of Tlachichuca, Ciudad Serdán, La Perla, Mariano Escobedo, and Calcahualco. The federal decree became federal law on January 4, 1937.

Climbing and recreation

Pico de Orizaba attracts a large number of international climbers every year. There are multiple routes for approaching and climbing the volcano, and many people attempt it. Most people climb the mountain during the period from October to March when the weather is favorable; temperatures do not vary much month to month due to being in the tropics and April through September are rainy months in the region.

For a more technical challenge for the experienced climber, there is a technical ice climb called the Serpents Head, which involves 10 pitches of grade 3 ice. Additionally, the southern side offers another challenging option; although the trail is shorter, it is also steeper and more difficult. No glaciers are found on the southern side. The final ascent to the summit is via a normally straightforward and crevasse-free glacier route. The caldera can be circumnavigated with relative ease, although at one point this requires a short, exposed traverse of steep rock and ice above the Glacier Este.

See also
List of mountain peaks of North America
List of mountain peaks of Mexico
List of volcanoes in Mexico
List of Ultras of Mexico
List of elevation extremes by country
Orizaba
Volcanic Seven Summits

Footnotes

References
 
  (in Spanish)

External links

 Equipment List to climb Pico de Orizaba
 Pico de Orizaba on Summitpost.com
 Pico de Orizaba - ascent route description

Volcanoes of Veracruz
Pico de Orizaba
Pico de Orizaba
Pico de Orizaba
Pico de Orizaba
Stratovolcanoes of Mexico
Seven Third Summits
Volcanic Seven Summits
Pico de Orizaba
Pico de Orizaba
Religious places of the indigenous peoples of North America
VEI-5 volcanoes
National parks of Mexico
Protected areas of Veracruz
Protected areas of Puebla
Pleistocene stratovolcanoes
Holocene stratovolcanoes